Kiilu is a name of Kenyan origin. Notable people with this name include:

As a surname 
 Peter Kiilu, Kenyan politician
 Vincent Mumo Kiilu, Kenyan sprint runner
 Raphael Kiilu, Kenyan diplomat

As a first name 
 Kiilu Nyasha, American activist

References 

Kenyan names
Given names
Surnames
Unisex given names